Manuel Velasco Coello (born 7 April 1980) is a Mexican lawyer and politician and a member of PVEM. He served as the Governor of Chiapas from 2012 to 2018. He was the first PVEM politician to become a governor. Prior to his governorship, he served as a state deputy, Federal deputy and Senator, each time becoming the youngest person to ever hold such office.

Life and career
Velasco was born on 7 April 1980 in Tuxtla Gutiérrez, Chiapas' capital. He was elected to Congress of Chiapas in 2001, becoming the youngest person to be ever elected to Chiapas' state legislature.

In 2003, he was elected Deputy of the LIX Legislature of the Mexican Congress representing Chiapas. At the age of 23, he became the youngest person to serve as a federal deputy. He left his Chamber seat to run for Senate, winning Chiapas' seat in the July elections. At the age of 26, Velasco set another history by becoming the youngest Senator in Mexican history.

In 2012, Velasco ran on a PRI-PVEM coalition ticket in the 2012 gubernatorial election and won, becoming Chiapas' governor later that year.

On December 9 2014, a video showing Velasco slap one of his assistants went viral. The video, recorded on a mobile phone, presents Velasco Coello behind a mesh barrier saluting people, when a woman dressed in red pulls his arm and the governor leads her to a young man walking behind him. After indicating the woman to talk to his assistant, unexpectedly, the governor slaps the young man in the face and, while walking, he is seen recriminating him as he follows Velasco. Velasco was forced to publicly apologise.

Personal life
He is the son of Leticia Coello Garrido and José Manuel Velasco Siles (1948-1988) and is married to actress and singer Anahí, with whom he has two sons.

He is the grandson of the former Governor of Chiapas, Manuel Velasco Suárez.

References

External links
 Official website

1980 births
Living people
Mexican people of Galician descent
People from Tuxtla Gutiérrez
Members of the Senate of the Republic (Mexico)
Members of the Chamber of Deputies (Mexico)
Governors of Chiapas
Ecologist Green Party of Mexico politicians
Members of the Congress of Chiapas
21st-century Mexican politicians